Colobosaura is a genus of lizard, endemic to South America, in the family Gymnophthalmidae.

Species
Two species are recognized as being valid.

Colobosaura kraepelini  - Chaco colobosaura
Colobosaura modesta  - Bahia colobosaura

References

Further reading
Boulenger GA (1887). Catalogue of the Lizards in the British Museum (Natural History). Second Edition. Volume III. Lacertidæ, Gerrhosauridæ, Scincidæ, Anelytropidæ, Dibamidæ, Chamæleontidæ. London: Trustees of the British Museum (Natural History). (Taylor and Francis, printers). xii + 575 pp. + Plates I-XL. (Colobosaura, new genus, p. 508).

 
Lizard genera
Taxa named by George Albert Boulenger